Shooting sports at the 1970 Asian Games was held in Sport Authority of Thailand Sport Complex Shooting Range, Bangkok, Thailand from 10 December 1970 to 19 December 1970. Shooting comprised seven individual and seven team events for a total of fourteen events, all open to both men and women.

Japan dominated the competition by winning eight gold medals.

Medalists

Medal table

References 

 ISSF Results Overview

External links
Asian Shooting Federation

 
1970 Asian Games events
1970
Asian Games
1970 Asian Games